Justin Lanning (born 21 February 1973) is an English former ice dancer. He is the 1993 British national champion with Marika Humphreys and the 2000 Nebelhorn Trophy champion with Chantal Lefebvre for Canada.

Career 
Justin Lanning originally competed with Marika Humphreys for the United Kingdom. After winning the 1993 British national title, they were sent to the 1993 European Championships, where they placed 12th, and to the 1993 World Championships, where they finished 17th. The following season, they took silver nationally and placed 16th at the 1994 World Championships.

Lanning skated with Czech ice dancer Radmila Chroboková in the 1997–98 season. He teamed up with Chantal Lefebvre to compete for Canada in October 1999. They won gold at the 2000 Nebelhorn Trophy and bronze at the 2001 Finlandia Trophy. They were coached by Kelly Johnson, David Islam, and Pavol Porac. Their partnership ended in 2002. Lanning retired from competition and now works as a dance coach with Skate Canada.

Results 
GP: Grand Prix

With Lefebvre for Canada

With Chroboková for the United Kingdom

With Humphreys for the United Kingdom

Programs 
(with Lefebvre)

References

External links
 

1973 births
English male ice dancers
Canadian male ice dancers
Living people
Sportspeople from London
English emigrants to Canada